Rajapani is a town and Village Development Committee  in Khotang District in the Sagarmatha Zone of eastern Nepal. At the time of the 1991 Nepal census it had a population of 3,444 people living in 622 individual households.

Currently, Rajapani lies on a Halesi Municipality-11, Halesi Mahadev temple ie great pilgrimage for Hindu and known as the pashupati of Eastern Nepal.

According to old peoples Rajapani is named after its pure quality of water ie., king of water so called as Rajapani. Rajapani is famous for oranges, its productive lands and its culture diversity various cast like Brahmins, Chhetri, Rai, Magar, Majhi, Bishokarma, Pariyar, Newar lives here with theirs own culture and traditions that carries a significant role to represent country cultural diversity,

References

External links
UN map of the municipalities of Khotang District

Populated places in Khotang District